Sävsjö HK is a handball club in Sävsjö, Sweden, established on 1 August 1978. The women's team won six Swedish national championship gold medals in a row between the 1993-1994 and the 1998-1999 seasons before being relegated from Elitserien during the 2002/2003 season.

References

External links
official website 

1978 establishments in Sweden
Handball clubs established in 1978
Swedish handball clubs
Sport in Jönköping County